Pelargonium cotyledonis (local name old father live forever) is an endemic species of plant on the island of Saint Helena in the South Atlantic Ocean. It is a white flowered, deciduous succulent plant, and is considered endangered. It is the sole member of monotypic section Isopetalum.

References

External links
Endemics of Saint Helena

cotyledonis
Flora of Saint Helena
Critically endangered plants